The Lower Sava Valley (also Spodnje Posavje and Posavska regija) is a region in southeastern Slovenia on the border with Croatia. It has three major urban centers: Brežice, Krško, and Sevnica. Its borders are almost identical with those of the Lower Sava Statistical Region.

It extends along the lower part of the Sava River, on the border with Croatia. In terms of its acreage, it is the second smallest region in Slovenia because it has only 885 km² and covers 4.4 percent of Slovenia’s territory. The neighboring regions are the Savinja region to the north, the Central Sava Valley to the west, and Lower Carniola to the south.       

According to the 2003 census, 70,262 people lived in the region, which constitutes 3.5 percent of Slovenia’s population. The region represents approximately 4.5% of Slovenian territory and covers 885 km². It is not densely populated; there are 79 people per km². The inhabitants live in 409 settlements. The following municipalities are part of the Lower Sava Valley: Krško, Brežice, Sevnica, Kostanjevica na Krki, Radeče, and Bistrica ob Sotli.

The Lower Sava Valley is a popular tourist destination due to its cultural, natural, and historical riches. Local culinary specialties, high-quality wines, and towns with rich heritage offer many opportunities for both fun and relaxation. There are many walking trails, riding trails, golf courses, and spas.

References

External links
 Posavje.info - najbolj brane novice iz Posavja
 Posavje - novice, informacije, dogodki (in Slovene only)

 
Historical regions in Slovenia